The 1997–98 National Football League, also known as the Philips National League for sponsorship reasons, was the second season of National Football League, the top Indian league for association football clubs, since its inception in 1996.

Overview
It was contested by 10 teams, and Mohun Bagan won the championship.

League standings

References

External links 
 Philips National League at Rec.Sport.Soccer Statistics Foundation
 

National Football League (India) seasons
1997–98 in Indian football
India